David W. Brown is an American author who lives in New Orleans, Louisiana. He is a regular contributor to The Atlantic, The New York Times, Scientific American, and The New Yorker.

Career as an author 
His work generally concerns the American space program. In 2016, he signed a publishing contract with HarperCollins to write a book titled The Mission, or: How a Disciple of Carl Sagan, an Ex-Motocross Racer, a Texas Tea Party Congressman, the World's Worst Typewriter Saleswoman, California Mountain People, and an Anonymous NASA Functionary Went to War with Mars, Survived an Insurgency at Saturn, Traded Blows with Washington, and Stole a Ride on an Alabama Moon Rocket to Send a Space Robot to Jupiter in Search of the Second Garden of Eden at the Bottom of an Alien Ocean Inside of an Ice World Called Europa (A True Story), about NASA's Europa exploration program. It is categorized as creative nonfiction, and was published in 2021. 

Previously, he co-authored Deep State: Inside the Government Secrecy Industry and The Command: Deep Inside the President's Secret Army with The Atlantic editor Marc Ambinder. 
Both books were published by John Wiley & Sons. His first book, Red Planet Noir, won the 2010 Next Generation Indie Book Award for Science Fiction.

In 2019, he signed a second publishing contract with HarperCollins to write a memoir about an expedition to Antarctica that he joined.

Brown is a former U.S. Army paratrooper and a veteran of Afghanistan. He holds a Master of Fine Arts in Creative Writing from University of Arkansas at Monticello and a Bachelor of Science in Computer Science from Louisiana State University.

Published works

References

External links
 
 David W. Brown at HarperCollins 
 David W. Brown on The Atlantic
 David W. Brown on Smithsonian Magazine
 David W. Brown on Scientific American
 David W. Brown on The New Yorker
 

21st-century American novelists
American bloggers
American male novelists
American science fiction writers
Writers from Baton Rouge, Louisiana
Writers from New Orleans
Louisiana State University alumni
University of Arkansas alumni
Living people
Year of birth missing (living people)
21st-century American male writers
Novelists from Louisiana
American male bloggers